Tai Don may be,

Tai Dón people
Tai Dón language